Alfonso Rodríguez Ochoa (born 30 January 1949 in Guadalupe, Nuevo León) is a Mexican politician affiliated with the Institutional Revolutionary Party.  he served as Deputy of the LIX Legislature of the Mexican Congress representing Nuevo León.

References

1949 births
Living people
People from Guadalupe, Nuevo León
Institutional Revolutionary Party politicians
Deputies of the LIX Legislature of Mexico
Members of the Chamber of Deputies (Mexico) for Nuevo León